is a railway station in Kashima, Saga Prefecture, Japan. It is operated by JR Kyushu and is on the Nagasaki Main Line.

Lines

Station layout 
The station consists of two side platforms serving two tracks. Track 1 is a through-track while track 2 is a passing loop. A siding branches off track 1. The station building is built in Japanese style in timber with a tiled roof. It is unstaffed and serves only as a waiting room. Access to the opposite side platform is by means of a footbridge.

Adjacent stations

History
Japanese Government Railways (JGR) built the station in the 1930s during the development of an alternative route for the Nagasaki Main Line along the coast of the Ariake Sea which was at first known as the Ariake Line. Hizen-Hanaura was opened on the same day as an intermediate station along the new stretch of track. On 1 December 1934, the entire route was completed and through-traffic achieved from Hizen-Yamaguchi through the station to Nagasaki. The track was then redesignated as part of the Nagasaki Main Line. With the privatization of Japanese National Railways (JNR), the successor of JGR, on 1 April 1987, control of the station passed to JR Kyushu.

Environs
Kashima Roadside Station
Gatalympics (during this time some limited express Kamome trains stop here)

See also
 List of railway stations in Japan

References

External links
Hizen-Nanaura Station (JR Kyushu)

Railway stations in Saga Prefecture
Nagasaki Main Line
Railway stations in Japan opened in 1930